Timsah Okalo Mulwal (born 1947) is a Sudanese boxer. He competed in the men's light welterweight event at the 1972 Summer Olympics.

References

1947 births
Living people
Light-welterweight boxers
Sudanese male boxers
Olympic boxers of Sudan
Boxers at the 1972 Summer Olympics
Place of birth missing (living people)